The 1967 European Amateur Boxing Championships  were held in Rome, Italy from 25 May to 2 June. The 17th edition of the bi-annual competition was organised by the European governing body for amateur boxing, EABA. There were 171 fighters from 26 countries participating.

Medal winners

Medal table

External links
Results
Amateur Boxing

European Amateur Boxing Championships
Boxing
European Amateur Boxing Championships
Boxing
Sports competitions in Rome
European Amateur Boxing Championships
European Amateur Boxing Championships
1960s in Rome